The Estádio Brinco de Ouro  ("Golden Earring"), also known as Estádio Brinco de Ouro da Princesa ("Princess' Golden Earring"), or just Brinco de Ouro ("Golden Earring"), is a football stadium inaugurated on May 31, 1953 in Campinas, São Paulo state, Brazil with a maximum capacity of 29,130 people. The stadium is owned by Guarani Futebol Clube and has a pitch size of 105,12m x 70,12m (today is 110m x 75m) Brinco de Ouro's architects were Ícaro de Castro Mello and Osvaldo Correio Gonçalves.

History

The stadium was inaugurated on May 31, 1953, originally with wood bleachers and a maximum capacity of 15,000 spectators. 22 years later, the wood bleachers were replaced by concrete bleachers, increasing the stadium maximum capacity to 25,000 people. In 1970, another bleachers block was added, and the maximum capacity was increased to 35,000 spectators. In 1978, Guarani won the Brazilian Championship, and the club board of directors decided to increase again the stadium maximum capacity. In 1980, toboggan-like bleachers were built, and the stadium maximum capacity was increased to 55,000 people. Today, the stadium has a maximum capacity of 29,130 spectators.

The inaugural match was played on May 31, 1953, when Guarani beat Palmeiras 3-1. The first goal of the stadium was scored by Guarani's Nilo.

The stadium's attendance record currently stands at 52,002, set on April 15, 1982 when Flamengo beat Guarani 3-2.

References

Enciclopédia do Futebol Brasileiro, Volume 2 - Lance, Rio de Janeiro: Aretê Editorial S/A, 2001.

External links
Templos do Futebol
Guarani Official Website

Brinco de Ouro
Brinco de Ouro
Buildings and structures in Campinas
Sports venues in São Paulo (state)